Edmonton-McClung is a provincial electoral district in Edmonton, Alberta, Canada. The district was created in 1993 and is named after Nellie McClung. The current MLA is Lorne Dach of the NDP, who was first elected in  2015.

History
The electoral district was created in the 1993 boundary redistribution out of the southern portion of Edmonton-Meadowlark. The district underwent minor changes in 1997 and 2004 and changed significantly in the 2010 boundary redistribution when the portions of the district to the south and east of Anthony Henday drive were put in the new electoral district of Edmonton-South West.

Boundary history

Electoral history

Edmonton-McClung was created in 1993. The first election held in the constituency was won by Incumbent Liberal candidate Grant Mitchell. Mitchell had previously served as Edmonton-Meadowlark MLA from 1986 to 1993. He would become leader of the Liberals and of the official opposition after Laurence Decore stepped down in 1994. The 1997 election would see Mitchell re-elected with a smaller share of the vote and his provincial campaign dropped the Liberals seat count. He would resign as leader and later as an elected representative on May 11, 1998.

The 1998 by-election was held on June 17, 1998, very shortly after Mitchell vacated his seat. The constituency returned new Alberta Liberal leader Nancy MacBeth with over half the popular vote in the constituency. Macbeth had served in the legislature as a Progressive Conservative MLA in Edmonton-Glenora. She was defeated by Ralph Klein in the 1992 leadership vote for the Progressive Conservative party and quit the party completely after her term expired in 1993.

The 2001 election would see a bitter and personal provincial campaign launched by MacBeth against Klein. She would be defeated in McClung by Progressive Conservative candidate Mark Norris and her party would suffer significant losses in other districts in the province.

After the election Norris was rewarded for defeating MacBeth with an appointment to the provincial cabinet. He served from 2001 to 2004 as the Minister of Economic Development under Premier Ralph Klein. Norris would run for a second term in the 2004 election. He would be defeated as the constituency returned to the Liberal column electing candidate Mo Elsalhy in a tight race. Norris was the only cabinet minister to lose his seat in that election.

The 2008 election would see the riding change hands again electing its fifth representative. The riding returned Progressive Conservative candidate David Xiao in another closely fought election over incumbent Elsalhy. The two are re-offering for a rematch in the 2012 election.

Legislature results

1993 general election

1997 general election

1998 by-election

2001 general election

2004 general election

2008 general election

2012 general election

2015 general election

2019 general election

Senate nominee results

2004 Senate nominee election district results
{| class="wikitable"
| colspan="5" align=center|2004 Senate nominee election results: Edmonton-McClung
| colspan="2"|Turnout 44.33%
|-
| colspan="2"| Affiliation
|Candidate
|Votes
|% Votes
|% Ballots
|Rank'

|Independent
|Link Byfield
|3,587
|12.28%
|37.43%
|4

|Michael Roth
|2,493
|8.54%
|26.01%
|7

|Independent
|Tom Sindlinger
|2,409
|8.25%
|25.14%
|9

|Gary Horan
|2,031
|6.96%
|21.91%
|10

|Vance Gough
|1,973
|6.75%
|20.59%
|8
|-
|colspan="3" align="right"|Total Votes|29,203|colspan="3"|100%|-
|colspan="3" align="right"|Total Ballots|9,584|colspan="3"|3.05 Votes Per Ballot|-
|colspan="3" align="right"|Rejected, Spoiled and Declined|colspan="4"|3,552'|}Voters had the option of selecting 4 Candidates on the Ballot''

2012 Senate nominee election district results

Student Vote results

On November 19, 2004 a Student Vote was conducted at participating Alberta schools to parallel the 2004 Alberta general election results. The vote was designed to educate students and simulate the electoral process for persons who have not yet reached the legal majority. The vote was conducted in 80 of the 83 provincial electoral districts with students voting for actual election candidates. Schools with a large student body that reside in another electoral district had the option to vote for candidates outside of the electoral district then where they were physically located.

2012 election

References

External links 
Website of the Legislative Assembly of Alberta

Alberta provincial electoral districts
Politics of Edmonton